KPM Music is a company that creates and provides library music that was originally known as KPM Musichouse. It was formed by the merger of KPM (the initials of Keith-Prowse-Maurice, which was then a division of EMI) and Musichouse (a company that EMI acquired in 1997).

History
The firm's origins date back to the Keith, Prowse & Co. partnership established in 1830. KPM's music library has been utilised in many films and television programmes worldwide.

The music written by KPM's composers was intended for use as signature tunes or incidental music in film and television. KPM pieces became the theme tunes for Mastermind, All Creatures Great and Small, The Avengers, Animal Magic, This Is Your Life, Dave Allen at Large, Superstars, Grandstand, Rugby Special and ITV News At Ten. In the U.S. the recordings have been used on Sesame Street.

In the United States, KPM is represented by APM Music.

KPM Musichouse was rebranded as EMI Production Music in 2011 and is now part of Sony Music Publishing. In January 2019, KPM's production library was fully digitized and became available for streaming online.

EMI Production Music was rebranded again to KPM Music on 13 September 2021.

References

External links
KPM Music - The Story history at APM (Associated Production Music)
KPM Music, the current official website of KPM

Music publishing companies of the United Kingdom
British companies established in 1830
Production music
NFL Films
Sony Music Publishing
EMI